Rufus featuring Chaka Khan is the gold-selling fourth studio album by the funk band Rufus and Chaka Khan, released on the ABC Records label in 1975. It remained on top of the R&B album chart for six consecutive weeks.

History
By 1975, Rufus and lead front woman Chaka Khan had become one of the most popular bands in popular music. With their successful mixing of funk, rock, soul and jazz and the powerful vocals of 22-year-old Khan, the group had set themselves apart from similar groups such as The Isley Brothers and Earth, Wind & Fire. By now, the group's billing had changed. While they were just known as Rufus on their first two releases, after the success of "Tell Me Something Good", the media (and Rufus' label at the time, ABC Records) had recognized that Khan was the attraction of the group.

Khan's popularity was starting to usurp that of her bandmates. For example, on the album's back cover and inner sleeve, Khan is featured with her trademark hair and outfits, sitting on a lips-decorated couch. On the cover, an animated cover of lips, which appeared to emulate Khan's, gave the impression that Khan was the dominant member of the group. Khan also handled all the talk in interviews for the group and she was given solo covers on magazines such as Jet and EBONY. As they entered the studio to record their fourth album, Khan and Rufus remained a collaborative group together. Unlike their three previous albums, they only recorded one cover version - The Bee Gees' "Jive Talkin'", while other songs were handled by group members and outside collaborators including, most notably, Gavin Christopher.

Tony Maiden, who had joined the group in mid-1974, also wrote more for the album. Khan brought lyrics for three compositions including what became one of Rufus' biggest hits, the ballad "Sweet Thing", which Khan and Maiden co-wrote together. After its release, Rufus Featuring Chaka Khan repeated the success of the band's previous two albums, going gold (later platinum) with sales of one million copies in the United States. By the end of the album's promotion, tensions had grown between Khan and group member Andre Fischer. Rufus Featuring Chaka Khan was the band's first album to top Billboard'''s R&B Albums chart and also reached #7 on Pop. The album included the singles "Sweet Thing", their second #1 hit on the R&B Singles chart and also #5 hit on Pop, "Dance Wit Me" (US R&B #5, US Pop #39) and the Bee Gees cover "Jive Talkin'" (US R&B #35). According to Billboard Magazine, "Rufus Featuring Chaka Khan" was the best selling R&B album of 1976 on the Year-End Charts.

Track listing

Personnel
Rufus
Chaka Khan – vocals
Tony Maiden – guitar, vocals
André Fischer – drums
Kevin Murphy – keyboards
Bobby Watson – bass guitar, vocals
with:
Tower of Power Horn Section – horns

Production
Rufus – producers
Austin Godsey – engineer 
John Calder, Peter Chaikin, Doug Rider – assistant engineers
Clare Fischer – string arrangements
Greg Adams – horn arrangements
Bill Imhoff - cover illustration

Charts

Later samples
"Ooh I Like Your Lovin'"
"The Blueprint" by Boogie Down Productions from the album Ghetto Music: The Blueprint of Hip Hop"Circles"
"The Becoming" by Little Brother from the album The Minstrel Show"Sweet Thing"
"B-Boy in Love" by Mellow Man Ace from the album Escape from Havanaand "Remind Me" by RBL Posse from the album "A Lesson to Be Learned"

See also
List of number-one R&B albums of 1976 (U.S.)

References

External linksRufus featuring Chaka Khan'' at Discogs

1975 albums
Rufus (band) albums
Chaka Khan albums
ABC Records albums